Nick von Esmarch (born November 2, 1976) is a former American actor. Born in San Mateo, California, he played high school football and did a small bit of amateur acting before being convinced by a friend to audition for the part of Dwight White for the TV series Nikki. He has since gone on to play parts in shows such as Crossing Jordan, Without A Trace and Drake & Josh.

Filmography

Beer Money (TV) - David 'Rutt' Rutledge (2001)
Nikki - Dwight White (2002)
Off Centre - Slab (2002)
Happy Family - Dr. Fishman (2004)
Crossing Jordan - Dan Meeks (2004)
My Wife and Kids - Bob Slobodonopopovich (2004)
JAG - Capt. Dale Alexander (2005)
Little Athens - Juicehead Dave (2005)
Drake and Josh Go To Holywood (TV) - Brice Granger (2006)
The Game - Ty Savage (2007)
Without A Trace - Steven O'Malley (2009)
The Mentalist - Thaddeus Delahay (2014)

External links

1976 births
Living people
People from San Mateo, California
Male actors from California
American male television actors
21st-century American male actors